The 1925 Nova Scotia general election was held on 25 June 1925 to elect members of the 38th House of Assembly of the Province of Nova Scotia, Canada. It was won by the Liberal-Conservative party.

Results

Results by party

Retiring incumbents
Labour
Arthur R. Richardson, Cape Breton Centre

Liberal
Angus Gladstone Buchanan, Victoria
Adam Dunlap Burris, Halifax
Daniel Alexander Cameron, Victoria
Joseph William Comeau, Digby
John L. Connolly, Halifax
Orlando Daniels, Annapolis
Robert Henry Graham, Pictou
Donald MacLennan, Inverness
Amédée Melanson, Yarmouth
James Sealy, Kings

United Farmers 
Gilbert Nelson Allen, Cumberland
John Alexander MacDonald, Hants
Angus J. MacGillivray, Antigonish
Robert Hunter Smith, Colchester
Harry L. Taggart, Colchester

Nominated candidates
Legend
bold denotes party leader
† denotes an incumbent who is not running for re-election or was defeated in nomination contest
The band that is coloured shows which candidates were successful in 1925.

Valley

|-
|rowspan=2 bgcolor=whitesmoke|Annapolis
|
|Frank R. Elliott3,16521.53%
|
|
||
|Obediah Parker Goucher4,33129.46%
||
|Frank R. Elliott
|-
|
|Kenneth L. Crowell3,07120.89%
|
|
||
|Harry Thompson MacKenzie4,13328.12%
||
|Orlando Daniels†
|-
|rowspan=2 bgcolor=whitesmoke|Digby
|
|Henry W.B. Warner2,54519.95%
|
|
||
|Jean-Louis Philippe Robicheau3,82730.00%
||
|Henry W.B. Warner
|-
|
|Gilbert J. Belliveau2,52419.78%
|
|
||
|William Hudson Farnham3,86230.27%
||
|Joseph William Comeau†
|-
|rowspan=2 bgcolor=whitesmoke|Hants
|
|James William Reid3,07520.08%
|
|
||
|Albert Parsons4,80631.38%
||
|James William Reid
|-
|
|Lionel A. Forsyth2,86018.68%
|
|
||
|Edgar Nelson Rhodes4,57329.86%
||
|John Alexander MacDonald†
|-
|rowspan=2 bgcolor=whitesmoke|Kings
|
|John A. McDonald4,96324.23%
|
|
||
|George Nowlan5,52026.95%
||
|John A. McDonald
|-
|
|Allison H. Borden4,54322.18%
|
|
||
|Reginald Tucker Caldwell5,45526.63%
||
|James Sealy†
|}

South Shore

|-
|rowspan=2 bgcolor=whitesmoke|Lunenburg
|
|John James Kinley4,52819.82%
|
|
||
|Wallace Norman Rehfuss7,15931.34%
||
|John James Kinley
|-
|
|Aubrey Sperry4,25418.62%
|
|
||
|William Haslam Smith6,90230.21%
||
|Aubrey Sperry
|-
|rowspan=2 bgcolor=whitesmoke|Queens
|
|George S. McClearn1,73523.06%
|
|
||
|William Lorimer Hall1,93425.70%
||
|George S. McClearn
|-
|
|Jordan W. Smith1,87424.90%
|
|
||
|Frank J.D. Barnjum1,98226.34%
||
|Jordan W. Smith
|-
|rowspan=2 bgcolor=whitesmoke|Shelburne
|
|Robert Irwin2,00121.90%
|
|
||
|Ernest Reginald Nickerson2,59628.42%
||
|Robert Irwin
|-
|
|Ernest Howard Armstrong2,08722.84%
|
|
||
|Norman Emmons Smith2,45226.84%
||
|Ernest Howard Armstrong
|-
|rowspan=2 bgcolor=whitesmoke|Yarmouth 
|
|Lindsay C. Gardner3,03222.66%
|
|
||
|John Flint Cahan3,85228.79%
||
|Vacant
|-
|
|René W.E. Landry3,07923.02%
|
|
||
|Raymond Neri d'Entremont3,41525.53%
||
|Amédée Melanson†
|}

Fundy-Northeast

|-
|rowspan=2 bgcolor=whitesmoke|Colchester
|
|Maynard B. Archibald2,63414.42%
|
|
||
|William Boardman Armstrong6,73336.86%
||
|Harry L. Taggart†
|-
|
|Frank A. Reynolds2,46113.47%
|
|
||
|Frank Stanfield6,43935.25%
||
|Robert Hunter Smith†
|-
|rowspan=3 bgcolor=whitesmoke|Cumberland
|
|James Ralston5,50813.45%
||
|Archibald Terris8,26720.18%
|
|
||
|Archibald Terris
|-
|
|Charles H. Read 4,79711.71%
|
|
||
|Percy Chapman Black9,05722.11%
||
|Gilbert Nelson Allen†
|-
|
|James M. Wardrope4,75411.61%
|
|
||
|Daniel George McKenzie8,58020.95%
||
|Daniel George McKenzie
|}

Halifax

|-
|rowspan=5 bgcolor=whitesmoke|Halifax
|
|John Murphy8,2916.86%
|
|Walter Mosher5710.47%
||
|John Archibald Walker15,67912.97%
||
|Adam Dunlap Burris†
|-
|
|John G. MacDougall8,2566.83%
|
|Robert Daw4800.40%
||
|William Drysdale Piercey15,67212.97%
||
|John L. Connolly†
|-
|
|John Brown Douglas7,9056.54%
|
|Alban L. Breen3920.32%
||
|Josiah Frederick Fraser15,98513.23%
||
|John Brown Douglas
|-
|
|Henry Bauld7,9006.54%
|
|
||
|John Francis Mahoney15,89913.16%
||
|Henry Bauld
|-
|
|Walter J.A. O'Hearn7,8726.51%
|
|
||
|Alexander Montgomerie15,95213.20%
||
|Walter J.A. O'Hearn
|}

Central Nova

|-
|rowspan=2 bgcolor=whitesmoke|Antigonish 
||
|John L. MacIsaac2,39327.74%
|
|
|
|Duncan S. Chisholm2,09524.29%
||
|Angus J. MacGillivray†
|-
||
|William Chisholm2,26726.28%
|
|
|
|Fred R. Irish1,87121.69%
||
|William Chisholm
|-
|rowspan=2 bgcolor=whitesmoke|Guysborough
|
|Clarence W. Anderson2,66823.70%
|
|
||
|Simon Osborn Giffin2,99526.61%
||
|Clarence W. Anderson
|-
|
|James Cranswick Tory2,76324.55%
|
|
||
|Howard Amos Rice2,83025.14%
||
|James Cranswick Tory
|-
|rowspan=3 bgcolor=whitesmoke|Pictou
|
|Archibald McColl5,59112.18%
|
|William Murray6951.51%
||
|John Doull9,43220.55%
||
|Vacant
|-
|
|John Welsford MacDonald5,46411.91%
|
|J. Gordon Calkin6681.46%
||
|Hugh Allan MacQuarrie9,04319.71%
||
|John Welsford MacDonald
|-
|
|George W. Whitman5,33211.62%
|
|Joseph White6101.33%
||
|Robert Albert Douglas9,05319.73%
||
|Robert Henry Graham†
|}

Cape Breton

|-
|rowspan=2 bgcolor=whitesmoke|Cape Breton Centre
|
|Daniel McDonald3,27714.68%
|
|Joseph Steele3131.40%
||
|Gordon Sidney Harrington7,62134.13%
||
|Joseph SteeleCape Breton
|-
|
|James McConnell3,21014.38%
|
|Emerson Campbell2951.32%
||
|Joseph Macdonald7,61134.09%
||
|Arthur R. Richardson†Cape Breton
|-
|rowspan=2 bgcolor=whitesmoke|Cape Breton East
|
|Dan C. McDonald9333.82%
|
|Forman Waye4,05116.57%
||
|John Carey Douglas7,27629.77%
||
|Forman WayeCape Breton
|-
|
|James L. McKinnon9283.80%
|
|D. W. Morrison4,18517.12%
||
|Alexander O'Handley7,07128.93%
||
|D. W. MorrisonCape Breton
|-
|rowspan=2 bgcolor=whitesmoke|Inverness
|
|Moses Elijah McGarry3,90624.46%
|
|
||
|Hubert Meen Aucoin4,01925.17%
||
|Donald MacLennan†
|-
|
|John C. Bourinot3,86224.19%
|
|
||
|Malcolm McKay4,18026.18%
||
|John C. Bourinot
|-
|rowspan=2 bgcolor=whitesmoke|Richmond-West Cape Breton
|
|Donald D. Boyd2,66721.67%
|
|
||
|Benjamin Amedeé LeBlanc3,50028.44%
||
|Benjamin Amedeé LeBlancRichmond
|-
|
|George R. Deveau2,63721.43%
|
|
||
|John Alexander MacDonald8,46652.70%
||
|John Alexander MacDonaldRichmond
|-
|rowspan=2 bgcolor=whitesmoke|Victoria
||
|Donald Buchanan McLeod1,87427.05%
|
|
|
|Hector A. McLeod1,62223.41%
||
|Angus Gladstone Buchanan†
|-
|
|Alexander K. McKenzie1,67224.13%
|
|
||
|Phillip McLeod1,76025.40%
||
|Daniel Alexander Cameron†
|}

References

Further reading
 
 

1925
1925 elections in Canada
1925 in Nova Scotia
June 1925 events